Thomas Jeeves Horder, 1st Baron Horder,  (7 January 1871 – 13 August 1955) was a British physician best known for his appointments as physician-in-ordinary to Kings Edward VII, Georges V and VI, and extra physician to Queen Elizabeth II. He was also the chosen physician of three prime ministers. He was knighted in 1918, made a baronet in 1923 and raised to the peerage in 1933.

Biography

Early life and education

Thomas Jeeves Horder was born on 7 January 1871, the son of draper Albert Horder, in Shaftesbury, Dorset. Jeeves was his mother's maiden name. He was educated privately, and at the University of London and St Bartholomew's Hospital, London.

Career
Horder began his career at St Bartholomew's Hospital, where his first junior post was under Samuel Gee. When still quite young, Horder successfully made a difficult diagnosis on King Edward VII which made his reputation. In 1908 he was appointed as the first physician to the Cancer Hospital, later known as the Royal Marsden Hospital.

His patients included every British monarch from Edward VII to Elizabeth II (except Edward VIII). They also included two prime ministers, Ramsay MacDonald and Bonar Law, and labour leader Hugh Gaitskell.

He was involved in many official committees including advising the Ministry of Food during World War II. After the war he opposed many of Aneurin Bevan's plans for a national health service and may have helped modify some of those less palatable to the medical profession.

He held the positions of Deputy Lieutenant County of Hampshire; Extra Physician to the Queen (formerly Extra Physician to King George VI); and Consulting Physician to St Bartholomew's Hospital (1912–1936). Knighted in 1918, he was created a Baronet in 1923. He was raised to the peerage as Baron Horder, of Ashford in the County of Southampton on 23 January 1933.

Horder served as president of the British Eugenics Society from 1935 to 1949. He was president of the Cremation Society of Great Britain from 1940 to his death in 1955.

He was president of The Peckham Experiment in 1949.

Marriage and children
In 1902 Horder married Geraldine Rose Doggett (1872–1954), of Newnham Manor, Hertfordshire, whose maternal grandfather was James Smith Rose of Arley House, Bristol, who in 1873 was the Mayor of Totnes. Their son was the publisher Mervyn Horder (1910–1997). Their daughter Joy Horder married Edward Cullinan, chief physician at St Bartholomew's Hospital; their son was British architect Edward Cullinan.
Endowed with abundant health and vitality to the end [?]; he was succeeded in his title by his son.

Awards and honors
1918: Knight Bachelor
1923: created  Baronet of Shaston
1925: Knight Commander of the Royal Victorian Order
1933: created 1st Baron Horder , of Ashford in the County of Southampton
1938: Knight Grand Cross of the Royal Victorian Order
Hon. DCL (Dunelm.)
Hon. MD (Melbourne and Adelaide)

Death and afterward
He lived for many years at Steep near Petersfield, Hampshire, where he died on 13 August 1955.

Published works

Articles
 "Medicine and the State." JAMA, vol. 140, no. 14 (August 6, 1949): 1135–1192. .

Books
 Clinical Pathology in Practice. London: H. Frowde (1910)
 Cerebro-Spinal Fever. London: Hodder & Stoughton (1915)
 Medical Notes. London: Hodder & Stoughton (1921)
 Essentials of Medical Diagnosis with A. E. Gow. Cassell & Co. (1928)
 Health and a Day. Dent (1938)
 Obscurantism. Watts & Co. (1938)
 Lessons Taught by War-time Feeding (1943)
 Rheumatism. H. K. Lewis & Co., (1944)
 Health and Social Welfare, 1944–1945. London & New York: Todd Publishing Company (1944)
 Health and Social Welfare, 1945–1946.
 Diet and Rheumatism (1945)
 British Encyclopaedia of Medical Practice (editor). Butterworth (1950–1952) 
 Fifty Years of Medicine. Duckworth (1953)
 Bread: The Chemistry and Nutrition of Flour and Bread with Sir Charles Dodds and T. Moran. Constable (1954)

Book contributions
 "Methods of Obtaining Material from the Body for Bacteriological Examination (revised and amplified)" (Chapter 7). In: A Laboratory Handbook of Bacteriology, by Rudolf Abel, pp. 178–184. Translated by M. H. Gordon. Oxford University Press (1907). .
 2nd English ed. (1912). London: H. Frowde & Hodder & Stoughton. .
 Foreword to Poverty and Population: A Factual Study of Contemporary Social Waste, by Richard M. Titmuss, x-xiii. London: Macmillan (1938)
 Foreword to Democracy Marches, by Julian Huxley, ix-x. London: Chatto & Windus with Hogarth Press; New York: Harper (1941). .

References

Further reading
 Obituary. British Medical Journal, vol. 2, no. 4937 (August 22, 1955): 493+. .
 Lawrence, Christopher. "A Tale of Two Sciences: Bedside and Bench in Twentieth-Century Britain." Medical History, vol. 43, no. 4 (October 1999): 421–449. .
"...a study of two distinguished English physicians, Thomas Horder and Walter Langdon Brown ... one of these I deem patrician: the world of aristocracy, privilege, deference, tradition, genteel leisure pursuits, face-to-face social relations and charitable service. The other was professional or meritocratic: the world of citizenship, rationally driven progress, impersonal social relations and expert opinion." (p. 421)

External links

 Works by Horder at Semantic Scholar
 
 

1871 births
1955 deaths
Alumni of the University of London
Barons in the Peerage of the United Kingdom
19th-century English medical doctors
20th-century English medical doctors
Knights Bachelor
Knights Grand Cross of the Royal Victorian Order
People from Shaftesbury
People from Steep, Hampshire
Barons created by George V